Muhammad Hudori (5 April 1968 – 24 October 2021) was an Indonesian bureaucrat and politician. He served as Secretary-General of the Ministry of Home Affairs from 2020 to 2021.

Following his death on 24 October 2021, Minister of Home Affairs Tito Karnavian appointed Suhajar Diantoro, an expert staff in the ministry, to replace him in an acting capacity. The inauguration took place two days after his death.

References

1968 births
2021 deaths
People from Pandeglang Regency
Politicians from Banten